The Pisa Baptistery of St. John is a Roman Catholic ecclesiastical building in Pisa, Italy. Construction started in 1152 to replace an older baptistery, and when it was completed in 1363, it became the second building, in chronological order, in the Piazza dei Miracoli, near the Duomo di Pisa and the cathedral's free-standing campanile, the famous Leaning Tower of Pisa. The baptistery was designed by Diotisalvi, whose signature can be read on two pillars inside the building, with the date 1153.

Description
The largest baptistery in Italy, it is 54.86 m high, with a diameter of 34.13 m. The Pisa Baptistery is an example of the transition from the Romanesque style to the Gothic style: the lower section is in the Romanesque style, with rounded arches, while the upper sections are in the Gothic style, with pointed wimpergs and a rich figurative program. Like the cathedral and the campanile the Baptistery is built of bichromatic Carrara marble, white with recurring horizontal lines in blueish-grey stone, also used for abstract floral and graphic decoration, a unique trait of some of the most important religious buildings in Tuscany (In the neighboring Florence and Pistoia the dark marmo verde from Prato was used).

The east portal from probably around 1200 is facing the facade of the cathedral. The door is flanked by two columns with foliage decoration, a direct copy of a classical model. Engaged with the portal frame are two smaller three-quarter columns with a simpler, less deep floral ornamentation. The inner jambs between each pair of columns are decorated each with eleven figurative reliefs executed in Byzantine style. On the left there are depictions of the months (with September and October combined in one panel), beginning with January at the bottom. On the right it begins at the top with the Ascension of Christ, then angels, Mary with lifted hands, then the Apostels depicted in pairs looking up, and second to the bottom the Harrowing of Hell; the lowermost relief shows King David. The tripartite form is conveyed in the arch with three retreating archivolts with the Twenty-Four Elders in medaillons and the Lamb as the keystone.

The architrave is divided in two tiers. The upper one is slightly tilted and shows Christ between the Mary and St. John the Baptist, flanked by angels and the evangelists. The lower tier depicts several episodes in the life of St. John the Baptist, the natural patron of the baptistery: his sermon, the baptism of Christ, his imprisonment on behalf of Herod, Salome dances before Herod, his subsequent beheading and his burial. The architraves are probably by the same artists who also did the foiled columns and the reliefs on the jambs.

Only the north portal has also figurative decoration on its architrave, picturing the Annunciation to Zechariah and St. Elizabeth, the parents of St. John, flanked by two prophets and two angels in light armour with swords.

The interior

The interior is overwhelming and lacks decoration. The octagonal font at the centre dates from 1246 and was made by Guido Bigarelli da Como. The bronze sculpture of St. John the Baptist at the centre of the font is a  work by Italo Griselli.

The pulpit was sculpted between 1255-1260 by Nicola Pisano, father of Giovanni, the artist who produced the pulpit in the Duomo. The scenes on the pulpit, and especially the classical form of the nude Hercules, show Nicola Pisano's qualities as the most important precursor of Italian Renaissance sculpture by reinstating antique representations: surveys of the Italian Renaissance often begin with the year 1260, the year that Nicola Pisano dated this pulpit.

Constructed on the same unstable sand as the tower and cathedral, the Baptistery leans 0.6 degrees toward the cathedral. Originally the shape of the Baptistery, according to the project by Diotisalvi, was different. It was perhaps similar to the church of Holy Sepulchre in Pisa, with its pyramidal roof. After the death of the architect, Nicola Pisano continued the work, changing the style to the more modern Gothic one. Also, an external roof was added giving the shape of a cupola. As a side effect of the two roofs, the pyramidal inner one and the domed external one, the interior is acoustically perfect, making of that space a resonating chamber.

The exterior of the dome is clad with lead sheets on its east side (facing the cathedral) and red tiles on its west side (facing the sea), giving a half grey and half red appearance from the south.

An inscription, currently undeciphered, is located to the left of the door jamb of the Baptistery.

See also
 History of medieval Arabic and Western European domes
 List of tallest domes

References

Further reading

Rory Carroll, "Pisa Baptistery is giant musical instrument, computers show,"
Pasini, Daria. Ancora sull’epigrafe con triplice invocazione all’arcangelo Michele [Again on the Epigraph with the Triple Invocation to the Archangel Michael]. GRADUS: Rivista di Archeologia e di Restauro, 10, 1: 18-24, URL: Inscription 
Perono Cacciafoco, Francesco. The Undeciphered Inscription of the Baptistery of Pisa. Academia Letters, 3359: 1-6, DOI: https://doi.org/10.20935/AL3359

Churches completed in 1363
Pisa
Roman Catholic churches in Pisa
Church buildings with domes
Romanesque architecture in Pisa
Buildings and structures of the Catholic Church in Europe
14th-century Roman Catholic church buildings in Italy